Fujiwara no Ieyoshi (藤原家良 1192 - 1264) was a waka poet and Japanese nobleman active in the Heian period and early Kamakura period. He was also known as Kinugasa Ieyoshi (衣笠家良).

External links 
E-text of his poems in Japanese

Fujiwara clan
1192 deaths
1264 deaths
12th-century Japanese poets